Cryptolechia is a genus of moths in the family Depressariidae.

Species
Cryptolechia aeraria Meyrick, 1910
Cryptolechia acutiuscula Wang, 2004 (from China)
Cryptolechia aganopis (Meyrick, 1905) (from Sri Lanka)
Cryptolechia aliena Diakonoff, 1952 (from Burma)
Cryptolechia alphitias Lower, 1923 (from Australia)
Cryptolechia anthaedeaga Wang, 2003
Cryptolechia anticentra (Meyrick, 1910) (from India)
Cryptolechia anticrossa Meyrick, 1915 (from Australia)
Cryptolechia argometra Meyrick, 1935 (from Taiwan)
Cryptolechia asemanta Dognin, 1905 (from Ecuador)
Cryptolechia bibundella (Strand, 1913) (from Cameroon)
Cryptolechia bifoliolata Wang, 2006 (from China)
Cryptolechia bifida Wang, 2006 (from China)
Cryptolechia bifoliolata Wang, 2006
Cryptolechia castella (Zeller, 1852) (from South Africa)
Cryptolechia centroleuca Meyrick, 1922 (from India)
Cryptolechia chlorozyga Meyrick, 1938 (from China)
Cryptolechia chrysocoma (Meyrick, 1905) (from Sri Lanka)
Cryptolechia citrodeta Meyrick, 1921 (from Brazil)
Cryptolechia coelocrossa Meyrick, 1935 (from China)
Cryptolechia conata Strand, 1917 (from Taiwan)
Cryptolechia concaviuscula Wang, 2004 (from China)
Cryptolechia coriaria Meyrick, 1914 (from Australia)
Cryptolechia coriata Meyrick, 1914 (from Taiwan)
Cryptolechia cornutivalvata Wang, 2003
Cryptolechia deflecta Wang, 2003
Cryptolechia denticulata Wang, 2004 (from China)
Cryptolechia diplosticha Meyrick, 1926 (from Colombia)
Cryptolechia dorsoprojecta Wang, 2006 (from China)
Cryptolechia eningiella (Plötz, 1880) (from Cameroon)
Cryptolechia eoa Meyrick, 1910 (from India)
Cryptolechia epidesma Walsingham, 1912 (from Mexico & Br.Guyana)
Cryptolechia epistemon Strand, 1920 (from Taiwan)
Cryptolechia eucharistis Meyrick, 1931
Cryptolechia falsitorophanes Wang, 2006 (from China)
Cryptolechia falsivespertina Wang, 2003
Cryptolechia fasciculifera Wang, 2004 (from China)
Cryptolechia fascirupta Wang, 2003
Cryptolechia fatua Meyrick, 1921
Cryptolechia fenerata Meyrick, 1914
Cryptolechia furcellata Wang, 2004 (from China)
Cryptolechia fustiformis Wang, 2006 (from China)
Cryptolechia gei Wang (from China)
Cryptolechia glischrodes Meyrick, 1931
Cryptolechia gypsochra Meyrick, 1938
Cryptolechia hamatilis Wang, 2004 (from China)
Cryptolechia hecate (Butler, 1883)
Cryptolechia hemiarthra Meyrick, 1922
Cryptolechia holopyrrha Meyrick, 1912
Cryptolechia hoplostola Meyrick, 1938
Cryptolechia hydara Walsingham, 1912
Cryptolechia ichnitis Meyrick, 1918
Cryptolechia infundibularis Wang, 2006 (from China)
Cryptolechia iridias Meyrick, 1910
Cryptolechia isomichla Meyrick, 1938
Cryptolechia jigongshanica Wang, 2003
Cryptolechia kangxianensis Wang, 2003
Cryptolechia laica Meyrick, 1910
Cryptolechia latifascia Wang, 2004 (from China)
Cryptolechia lindsayae Philpott, 1928
Cryptolechia luniformis Wang, 2006 (from China)
Cryptolechia mataea (Meyrick, 1910) (from India)
Cryptolechia mellispersa Diakonoff, 1952 (from Birma)
Cryptolechia metacentra Meyrick, 1914 (from Taiwan)
Cryptolechia micracma Meyrick, 1910 (from Sri Lanka)
Cryptolechia microbyrsa Wang, 2003
Cryptolechia microglyptis Meyrick, 1936
Cryptolechia mirabilis Wang, 2003
Cryptolechia mitis Meyrick, 1914 (from Taiwan)
Cryptolechia modularis Meyrick, 1921 (from Java)
Cryptolechia municipalis Meyrick, 1920 (from Australia)
Cryptolechia murcidella Christoph, 1877 (from Iran)
Cryptolechia muscosa Wang, 2004
Cryptolechia neargometra Wang, 2003
Cryptolechia olivaria Wang, 2006 (from China)
Cryptolechia orthotoma (Meyrick, 1905) (from Sri Lanka)
Cryptolechia orthrarcha Meyrick, 1930 (from Algeria)
Cryptolechia paranthaedeaga Wang, 2003
Cryptolechia pateropa Meyrick, 1931 (from Brazil)
Cryptolechia peditata Wang, 2006 (from China)
Cryptolechia pelophaea Meyrick, 1931 (from Taiwan)
Cryptolechia pentathlopa Meyrick, 1933 (from Brazil)
Cryptolechia percnocoma Meyrick, 1930 (from Brazil)
Cryptolechia perversa Meyrick, 1918 (from India)
Cryptolechia phoebas (Meyrick, 1907) (from India)
Cryptolechia picrocentra Meyrick, 1921 (from India)
Cryptolechia praevecta Meyrick, 1929 (from Colombia)
Cryptolechia prothyropa Meyrick, 1938 (from China)
Cryptolechia proximideflecta Wang, 2004
Cryptolechia proximihamatilis Wang, 2006 (from China)
Cryptolechia pytinaea (Meyrick, 1902) (from Australia)
Cryptolechia rectimarginalis Wang, 2006 (from China)
Cryptolechia remotella (Staudinger, 1899)
Cryptolechia rhodobapta Meyrick, 1923
Cryptolechia rigidellum (Chrétien, 1915) (from Algeria)
Cryptolechia robusta Wang, 2006 (from China)
Cryptolechia rostriformis Wang, 2006 (from China)
Cryptolechia schistopa (Meyrick, 1902) (from Australia)
Cryptolechia sciodeta Meyrick, 1930 (from Brazil)
Cryptolechia semibrunnea Dognin, 1905 (from Ecuador)
Cryptolechia similifloralis Wang, 2006 (from China)
Cryptolechia solifasciaria Wang, 2004 (from China)
Cryptolechia sperans Meyrick, 1926 (from Borneo)
Cryptolechia spinifera Wang, 2004 (from China)
Cryptolechia stadaea Meyrick, 1934 (from China)
Cryptolechia sticta Wang, 2006 (from China)
Cryptolechia stictifascia Wang, 2003
Cryptolechia straminella (Zeller, 1852) (from South Africa)
Cryptolechia taphrocopa Meyrick, 1926 (from Colombia)
Cryptolechia temperata Meyrick, 1910 (from India)
Cryptolechia tetraspilella (Walker, 1864) (from Sri Lanka)
Cryptolechia transfossa Meyrick, 1926 (from Peru)
Cryptolechia trimaculata Wang, 2006 (from China)
Cryptolechia tyrochyta Meyrick, 1910 (from India)
Cryptolechia varifascirupta Wang, 2003
Cryptolechia veniflua Meyrick, 1914 (from Colombia)
Cryptolechia vespertina Meyrick, 1910 (from India)
Cryptolechia viridisignata (Strand, 1913) (from Equatorial Guinea)
Cryptolechia zeloxantha Meyrick, 1934 (from China)
Cryptolechia zhengi Wang, 2003

Former species
Cryptolechia amphigramma Meyrick, 1915
Cryptolechia anomarcha Meyrick, 1915
Cryptolechia argyropasta (Walsingham, 1912)
Cryptolechia arvalis Meyrick, 1910
Cryptolechia compsotypa (Meyrick, 1886)
Cryptolechia dochaea Meyrick, 1910
Cryptolechia empalacta Meyrick, 1915
Cryptolechia exagitata Meyrick, 1926
Cryptolechia facunda (Meyrick, 1910)
Cryptolechia ferrorubella Walker, 1864
Cryptolechia leptopa Diakonoff, 1952
Cryptolechia liochroa (Meyrick, 1891)
Cryptolechia malacobyrsa Meyrick, 1921
Cryptolechia malaisei Diakonoff, 1952
Cryptolechia phaeocausta Meyrick, 1934
Cryptolechia propriella Zeller, 1877
Cryptolechia purpurascens (Walsingham, 1912)
Cryptolechia synclera Meyrick, 1921
Cryptolechia torophanes Meyrick, 1935

References
www.nhm.ac.uk genus database
"Cryptolechia Zeller, 1852" at Markku Savela's Lepidoptera and Some Other Life Forms
Wang, 2004. A Study of Cryptolechia Zeller (Lepidoptera, Oecophoridae) in China (II).

 
Cryptolechiinae